The Hungarian Federalist Party (Hungarian Magyar Föderalista Párt) was a Slovakian political party defending the interests of the Hungarian minority in Slovakia. It had a status of observer in the European Free Alliance until its disbanding in 2005.

Political parties of minorities in Slovakia
Banned political parties
Hungarian minority interests parties